Mygalarachne is a monotypic genus of Honduran tarantulas containing the single species, Mygalarachne brevipes. It was first described by Anton Ausserer in 1871, and is found in Honduras.

See also
 List of Theraphosidae species

References

Monotypic Theraphosidae genera
Spiders of Central America
Taxa named by Anton Ausserer
Theraphosidae